Desaparecidos is a Spanish police procedural television series starring Juan Echanove, Elvira Mínguez, Maxi Iglesias and Michelle Calvó, dealing about the work of a police unit specialised on cases of missing people. Produced by Mediaset España and Plano a Plano, the first season was originally released on Amazon Prime Video on 19 June 2020.

Premise 
The fiction tracks the work of the Brigada Central de la Policía'''s  Grupo 2 de Desaparecidos police unit led by Santiago Abad (Juan Echanove) after the incorporation of Inspector Sonia Ledesma (Michelle Calvó). It also features the police collaboration with an association for support of missing person cases, 'Ayuda Desaparecidos'.

 Cast 
Main
 Juan Echanove as Chief Inspector Santiago Abad.
 Michelle Calvó as Inspector Sonia Ledesma.
 Elvira Mínguez as Carmen Fuentes, director of the NGO 'Ayuda Desaparecidos'. 
 Maxi Iglesias as Deputy Inspector Rodrigo Medina. 
  as Sebastián "Sebas" Cano.
 Amanda Ríos as Azhar García. 
Recurring and guest

 Production and release 
The writing team of the first season was formed by Curro Royo, Miguel Ángel Fernández, Irene Olaciregui, Mercedes Cruz, Juan Vicente Pozuelo, Joaquín Górriz and Eva Peris, whereas the episodes were directed by Miguel Ángel Vivas (who directed the key episodes), Inma Torrente and Jacobo Martos. Shooting took place in 2019 in Madrid.

Featuring a running time of around 72 minutes, the 13 episodes comprising the first season were released on Amazon Prime Video on 19 June 2020.

While Mediaset España renovated Desaparecidos'' for a second season, they broke the collaboration with the production company Plano a Plano, due to financial disagreements, tasking instead the production of the second season to Unicorn Content, the company led by Xelo Montesinos and Ana Rosa Quintana.

Awards and nominations 

|-
| align = "center" rowspan = "2" | 2021 || rowspan = "2" | 8th  || colspan = "2" | Best Drama Series ||  || rowspan = "2" | 
|-
| Best Drama Actor || Juan Echanove || 
|}

References 

2020 Spanish television series debuts
2020s Spanish drama television series
Spanish police procedural television series
Television series about missing people
Spanish-language television shows
2020s police procedural television series
Spanish-language Amazon Prime Video original programming
Television shows filmed in Spain
Television series by Plano a Plano